Oxshott is a suburban village in the borough of Elmbridge in Surrey, England. Oxshott includes hilly acidic heath which is partly wooded (see Esher Commons and Prince's Coverts) and occupies the land between the large towns of Esher and Leatherhead. The Oxshott section of the single carriageway north-south A244 runs through its middle and briefly forms its high street, centred  from the A3 (Portsmouth Road) and the M25 (London Orbital motorway). A survey in 2010 by the Daily Telegraph asserted it was "the village with most footballers" in England and mentioned other celebrities who chose to live in the village — Chelsea F.C. have their main training ground in Stoke D'Abernon, which, together with Oxshott, makes up an electoral ward of Surrey County Council.

Before about 1912, there was an equally-used alternative spelling, Ockshot. Oxshott was part of Stoke D'Abernon parish until 1912, when Oxshott gained its first place of worship. The Prince's Coverts remains part of the Crown Estate, albeit decreased by some privatisation; and the public land of the village has been protected by inclusion in the Metropolitan Green Belt.

A great many of Oxshott's residential areas are on gated private roads. This, combined with the large and desirable properties that form much of the village's housing stock, contributes to Oxshott's status as the "most expensive village in England".

History
Oxshott means "Ocga's corner of land", from the Old English personal name Ocga and sceat (related to modern 'shoot') "corner of land". The first element does not, unlike Oxford, have anything to do with oxen.

The name was recorded in 1179 as Occesete. At this time Oxshott was a hamlet in the east of the village of Stoke D'Abernon of about 200 people and manor living greatly from the land, rather than trade, from forestry, farming and the keeping of pigs.

Until the 16th century, Oxshott was fairly isolated from other centres of population, surrounded by heath and scrubland and connected to nearby villages only by footpaths. For almost the whole of a further three centuries, no major transport links crossed the parish.

In 1820, the Duchess of Kent laid the foundation stone of the national primary school here, which was enlarged in 1897. In 1885, Oxshott railway station, first named Oxshott and Fairmile, was opened on the new Guildford Line, making the area accessible to day-trippers. The following 30 years saw Oxshott expand.

The Crown Commissioners limited early housing development to mansions or villas suitable for occupation by wealthy families. Examples of these are Danes Hill, Broom Hall and Bevendean. Subsequently, the village has expanded further, and now includes most types of housing, except for medium–and high–rise.

The religious needs of the growing population were met by the consecration of St. Andrew's Church in 1912, in the Church of England. Oxshott became a parish in its own right in 1913 under that name; this putting an end to the use of the pre-1913 spelling of Ockshot, as used, for example, in 1911 in its topographical description in the Victoria County History. The high street expanded from what were once just three shops: a drapers, a tobacconists and a set of tea-rooms. Industry arrived in Oxshott when John Early Cook set up his brickworks from the local deep patch of suitable clay, in 1866. Production continued until 1958, and the works' distinctive chimney was demolished in 1967. Heathfield Pond is the site of the brickwork pit; it was previously called Brick Pond. The pond is about 100 ft (30 metres) deep with a cottage and machinery at the bottom. Alfie Skelton (aged 15) died in a boating accident on the pond in March 2011.

From 1920 until 1978, the Oxshott Pottery, founded by Henry & Denise Wren, was based at Potters Croft in Oakshade Road, Oxshott.

Surrounding area

Transport
Oxshott is served by commuter trains, with services taking (best time) 38 minutes to Waterloo station calling at Vauxhall for interchange with the Victoria line, with local bus services also available. Oxshott railway station is just off Oxshott Heath, to the south of Oxshott Woods. Oxshott Heath, geologically, has an escarpment where the London clay and sand strata are raised substantially. For this reason, Oxshott had a brickworks from 1866 to 1958. The brickworks was served by a branch line that ran West from the station (towards Guildford). This is why the footbridge at the end of Sheath's Lane (this is the proper, historic spelling) can span three tracks.

At Cook's Crossing (named after John Early Cook, the owner of the brickyards), the railway crossing had three lines: two for the electrified main line to Guildford via Cobham and Stoke D'Abernon and a single track to the brickyards. This latter track can still be seen if one looks hard, and the old hand-operated gates were removed in the first years of the 21st century. The single track now disappears into the houses built on the brickyards on Somerville Road.

Many people have signed petitions for Oxshott to have a proper bus route. The current connections in the village are: the 408 every two hours, connecting to Leatherhead, Ashtead, and Epsom in one direction, and to Cobham in the other; the 513 to/from Kingston upon Thames three times a day; and the Chatterbus to/from Cobham five times a day.

2010 Oxshott train accident
On Friday 5 November 2010, at 15:40, there was an accident where the Guildford via Cobham railway line passes in a deep cutting under the Esher to Leatherhead road. Of the 40 people on board the train, four were injured. The lorry driver of the lorry was badly injured, and also apparently had a heart attack and had to be carefully taken out of the cab by the medical services. Rail and road had been cleared and re-opened by early the following Monday.

Amenities
Oxshott has one, Anglican, church, St. Andrew's. Oxshott has its own primary school, the Royal Kent, named because its predecessor was founded by the Duchess of Kent, Queen Victoria's mother, in 1820. The original building stood on the site of the petrol station. Oxshott has an independent preparatory school, Danes Hill School, and its pre-prep school, Bevendean. A senior independent school, Reed's School, just beyond its northern boundary, caters for boys aged 11 to 18 and girls aged 16 to 18.

There is also a very active sports club, which has developed from the village cricket club founded in 1896. Oxshott also has two public houses: The Victoria and The Bear.

The village has a large number of United States nationals and expatriates with their social organisations, due in part to the nearby ACS Cobham International school.

The village features in some versions, such as the Summer Olympics version, of the currently annual London-Surrey cycle classic.

In film and fiction
Oxshott is featured in the popular Shopaholic novels by British author Sophie Kinsella, as the hometown of the series' narrator, Becky Bloomwood.

A greater part of the historic novel "Unter der Asche" (Beneath the ashes) by German author Tom Finnek is set in Oxshott and nearby Cobham. The novel deals with the Great Fire of London 1665–66 and the so-called "Diggers", a nonconformist dissenting group during the English Civil War.

Some scenes from the Monty Python feature film Jabberwocky (1977) were filmed in Oxshott Woods.

In the 1970s ITV situation comedy George and Mildred, Mildred's brother-in-law Humphrey is described as "the offal king of Oxshott".

Notable residents
 Becky Bloomwood – fictional character in the Shopaholic novels of Sophie Kinsella
 Violette Cordery - racing driver and long distance record breaker.
 Didier Drogba – professional footballer for Chelsea
 Graeme Le Saux – professional footballer
 David Lloyd – founder of David Lloyd Leisure Clubs
 Colin Montgomerie – professional golfer
 Andy Murray – tennis player 
 Jamie Redknapp – Liverpool midfielder
 Tilly Smith - saved nearly a hundred people from the 2004 Indian Ocean earthquake and tsunami at age 10
 John Terry – professional footballer for Chelsea, Aston Villa and England
 Chris Wolstenholme – bass player and backing vocalist for alternative rock band Muse
A number of professional footballers settled at the start of the 21st century in Oxshott, because of the proximity of the Chelsea Football Club training grounds at Stoke D'Abernon.

Demography and housing

The average level of accommodation in the region composed of detached houses was 28%, the average that was apartments was 22.6%.

The proportion of households in the settlement who owned their home outright compares to the regional average of 35.1%. The proportion who owned their home with a loan compares to the regional average of 32.5%. The remaining % is made up of rented dwellings (plus a negligible % of households living rent-free).

Gallery

Notes and references
Notes 

References

External links

 Old Station Masters House
 Oxshott Village Sports Club
 St. Andrew's Church, Oxshott

Villages in Surrey
Borough of Elmbridge